The Horikawa H-23B-2 is a two-seat training glider designed and built in Japan in the 1950s. It was produced in small numbers.

Design and development

The Horikawa H-23B-2 is a more advanced trainer than the same designer's H-22B-3.  Ikuo Horikawa was a director of the Hagiwara Glider Company which built both types.  It is a high braced wing monoplane, with a pair of V-form struts supporting the wing on both sides. The wing is a two spar structure, covered with a mixture of plywood and fabric. It is tapered and has 1° 20' of dihedral.  There are wooden, fabric covered ailerons and spoilers on the upper surface.

The H-23B-2 has a steel tube framed, fabric covered, polygonal section fuselage. Its two-seat tandem cockpit is enclosed, the top of the canopy blending into the wing leading edge.  Aft, the fuselage is built up to the trailing edge but tapers away rearward.  The tail unit has cantilever, straight edged, fabric covered wooden structured surfaces with the horizontal tail on top of the fuselage and placed well forward of the rudder. The undercarriage is a fixed monowheel, assisted by a rubber sprung skid under the nacelle and a tail skid.

The first flight was made on 10 September 1956; at least eight were produced.

Specifications

See also

Notes

References

External links
Göttingen 532 airfoil
Göttingen 676 airfoil

1950s Japanese aircraft
Glider aircraft
Aircraft first flown in 1956